Cross Creek Township may refer to the following townships in the United States:

 Cross Creek Township, Jefferson County, Ohio
 Cross Creek Township, Washington County, Pennsylvania